In computer science, the AF-heap is a type of priority queue for integer data, an extension of the fusion tree using an atomic heap proposed by M. L. Fredman and D. E. Willard.

Using an AF-heap, it is possible to perform  insert or decrease-key operations and  delete-min operations on machine-integer keys in time . This allows Dijkstra's algorithm to be performed in the same  time bound on graphs with  edges and  vertices, and leads to a linear time algorithm for minimum spanning trees, with the assumption for both problems that the edge weights of the input graph are machine integers in the transdichotomous model.

See also
 Fusion tree

References

Heaps (data structures)
Priority queues